Georg Schneider may refer to:

 Georg Schneider (footballer, born 1892) (1892–1961), German international footballer
 Georg Schneider (footballer, born 1959) (born 1959), German footballer
 Georg Schneider (politician) (1909–1970), German politician, biologist and university lecturer

See also
 Schneider (surname)
 George Schneider (disambiguation)
 Georges Schneider (1925–1963), Swiss alpine skier